Ian Stephen Markham (born 1962) is an Episcopal priest and the Dean and President of Virginia Theological Seminary (VTS) since August 2007. Previously, he served at Hartford Seminary in Connecticut as Dean and Professor of Theology and Ethics.

Education and academic career 
Markham obtained a Bachelor of Divinity degree in theology at the University of London and a Master of Letters degree in philosophy and ethics at the University of Cambridge. He finished his Doctor of Philosophy degree at the University of Exeter, focusing on Christian ethics.

He started to take the role of Dean and President of VTS since August 2007.

Personal life 
He is married to Lesley Markham and has one son, Luke.

Published works

Books authored
 
 The Godparents' Handbook. With Legood, Giles. London: SPCK. 1997. .
 
 The Church Wedding Handbook. With Legood, Giles. London: SPCK. 2000. .
 The Funeral Handbook. With Legood, Giles. London: SPCK. 2003. .
 
 
 
 
 
 
 An Introduction to Said Nursi: Life, Thought, and Writings. With Pirim, Suendam Birinci. Farnham, England: Ashgate Publishing. 2011. .
 Episcopal Questions, Episcopal Answers: Exploring Christian Faith. With Robertson, C. K. New York: Morehouse Publishing. 2014. .

Books edited
 A World Religions Reader. Editor. Oxford: Basil Blackwell. 1996. .
 The Middle Way: Theology, Politics and Economics in the Later Thought of R.H. Preston. Edited with Elford, R. John. London: SCM Press. 2000. .
 Theological Liberalism: Creative and Critical. Edited with Jobling, J'annine. London: SPCK. 2000. .
 Encountering Religion: An Introduction to the Religions of the World. Edited with Ruparell, Tinu. Malden, Massachusetts: Blackwell Publishing. 2001. .
 September 11: Religious Perspectives on the Causes and Consequences. Edited with Abu-Rabi‘, Ibrahim M. Oxford: Oneworld. 2003. .
 Globalization, Ethics and Islam: The Case of Bediuzzaman Said Nursi. Edited with Özdemir, İbrahim. Burlington, Vermont: Ashgate Publishing. 2005. .
 Why Liberal Churches Are Growing. Edited with Percy, Martyn. London: T&T Clark. 2006. .
 The Student's Companion to the Theologians. Editor. Oxford: Wiley-Blackwell. 2013. . .
 The Wiley-Blackwell Companion to the Anglican Communion. Edited with Hawkins, J. Barney, IV; Terry, Justyn; Steffensen, Leslie Nuñez. Oxford: Wiley-Blackwell. 2013. . .

Book chapters
 "The Liberal Tradition and Its Conservative Successors". In Jobling, J'annine; Markham, Ian. Theological Liberalism: Creative and Critical. London: SPCK. 2000. pp. 1–14. .
 "Ronald Preston and the Contemporary Ethical Scene". In Markham, Ian S.; Elford, R. John. The Middle Way: Theology, Politics and Economics in the Later Thought of R.H. Preston. London: SCM Press. 2000. pp. 257–265. .
 "Structures for Theological Conversation". With Ledbetter, Shannon. In Jobling, J'annine; Markham, Ian. Theological Liberalism: Creative and Critical. London: SPCK. 2000. pp. 142–154. .
 "Shintoism". In Markham, Ian S.; Ruparell, Tinu. Encountering Religion: An Introduction to the Religions of the World. Malden, Massachusetts: Blackwell Publishing. 2001. .
 "9.11: Contrasting Reactions and the Challenge of Dialogue". In Markham, Ian; Abu-Rabi‘, Ibrahim M. September 11: Religious Perspectives on the Causes and Consequences. Oxford: Oneworld. 2003. pp. 206ff. .
 "Religious or Secular: The Ethics of Said Nursi". In Markham, Ian; Özdemir, İbrahim. Globalization, Ethics and Islam: The Case of Bediuzzaman Said Nursi. Burlington, Vermont: Ashgate Publishing. 2005. .
 "Rethinking Globalization: Bediuzzaman Said Nursi's Risale-I Nur in Conversation with Empire by Hardt and Negri". In Markham, Ian; Özdemir, İbrahim. Globalization, Ethics and Islam: The Case of Bediuzzaman Said Nursi. Burlington, Vermont: Ashgate Publishing. 2005. .
 "Two Conditions for a Growing Liberal Church: Right Theology and Right Clergy". In Percy, Martyn; Markham, Ian. Why Liberal Churches Are Growing. London: T&T Clark. 2006. pp. 160–166. .
 "The Anglican Church of Southern Africa". In Markham, Ian S.; Hawkins, J. Barney, IV; Terry, Justyn; Steffensen, Leslie Nuñez. The Wiley-Blackwell Companion to the Anglican Communion. Oxford: Wiley-Blackwell. 2013. pp. 194–198. . .
 "B. B. Warfield (1851–1921)". In Markham, Ian S. The Student's Companion to the Theologians. Oxford: Wiley-Blackwell. 2013. pp. 350–352. . .
 "Black Theology". In Markham, Ian S. The Student's Companion to the Theologians. Oxford: Wiley-Blackwell. 2013. pp. 371–377. . .
 "The Church of South India (United)". In Markham, Ian S.; Hawkins, J. Barney, IV; Terry, Justyn; Steffensen, Leslie Nuñez. The Wiley-Blackwell Companion to the Anglican Communion. Oxford: Wiley-Blackwell. 2013. pp. 355–358. . .
 "Friedrich Daniel Ernst Schleiermacher (1768–1834)". In Markham, Ian S. The Student's Companion to the Theologians. Oxford: Wiley-Blackwell. 2013. pp. 320–325. . .
 "Gustavo Gutiérrez (1928– )". In Markham, Ian S. The Student's Companion to the Theologians. Oxford: Wiley-Blackwell. 2013. pp. 402–405. . .
 "Interreligious Relations in the Anglican Communion". In Markham, Ian S.; Hawkins, J. Barney, IV; Terry, Justyn; Steffensen, Leslie Nuñez. The Wiley-Blackwell Companion to the Anglican Communion. Oxford: Wiley-Blackwell. 2013. pp. 657–665. . .
 "James Packer (1926– )". In Markham, Ian S. The Student's Companion to the Theologians. Oxford: Wiley-Blackwell. 2013. pp. 475–477. . .
 "John Nelson Darby (1800–1882)". In Markham, Ian S. The Student's Companion to the Theologians. Oxford: Wiley-Blackwell. 2013. pp. 262–264. . .
 "Keith Ward (1938– )". In Markham, Ian S. The Student's Companion to the Theologians. Oxford: Wiley-Blackwell. 2013. pp. 541–545. . .

See also
 List of Virginia Theological Seminary people

References

Further reading

External links
Dean's webpage
Faculty profile of Ian Markham

1962 births
21st-century American Episcopalians
Alumni of the University of Cambridge
Alumni of the University of Exeter
Alumni of the University of London
American Episcopal priests
American Episcopal theologians
Fellows of King's College London
Heads of universities and colleges in the United States
Hartford Seminary faculty
Living people
Virginia Theological Seminary faculty